Stockbridge Junior/Senior High School is a public secondary school serving grades 7–12 in Stockbridge, Michigan, United States.  It is part of the Stockbridge Community Schools.

History

Demographics

The demographic breakdown of the 572 students enrolled for the 2015–2016 academic year was:

Male - 54.0%
Female - 46.0%
Black - 1.0%
Hispanic - 4.9%
White - 93.7%
Multiracial - 0.4%

31.3% of the students were eligible for free or reduced-cost lunch.

Academics

Stockbridge was unranked in the 2018 U.S. News & World Report annual ranking.

Athletics
The Stockbridge Panthers compete in MHSAA as a member of the Greater Lansing Activities Conference. The team colors are orange and black. Prior to 2014, the Panthers were in the Capital Area Activities Conference in the White Division.

The following MHSAA sanctioned sports are offered:

Baseball (boys)
Basketball (boys and girls)
Bowling (boys and girls) 
Competitive cheer (girls)
Cross country (boys and girls)
Boys state champions - 1994, 1995
Football (boys)
Golf (boys and girls)
Soccer (boys and girls) 
Softball (girls)
Track & field (boys and girls)
Volleyball (girls)
Wrestling (boys)

Additionally, Stockbridge offers equestrian teams for boys and girls sanctioned by the Michigan Interscholastic Horsemanship Association (MIHA).

The Leslie High School Blackhawks of Leslie, Michigan are a rival of Stockbridge. In football, the rivalry was first played in 1910 and have met at least once per year ever since. It is said to be one of the oldest rivalries in the state of Michigan. In the mid 1990s, Leslie decided to create a trophy that would go to the winning school. The trophy has a helmet on it.

References

External links

Schools in Ingham County, Michigan
Lansing–East Lansing metropolitan area
Public high schools in Michigan
Public middle schools in Michigan